The 2013–14 Boston Bruins season was their 90th season in the National Hockey League (NHL). The team finished with the most points in the league, securing the Presidents' Trophy. In the playoffs, they defeated the Detroit Red Wings in five games, but in the second round lost to their bitter rivals the Montreal Canadiens, in seven games.

Standings

Schedule and results

Preseason

Regular season

Playoffs

The Boston Bruins earned the Presidents' Trophy by finishing the regular season with the league's best record. They faced the Detroit Red Wings in the first round and won the series 4–1. They advanced to the second round where they were defeated 3–4 by the Montreal Canadiens, and eliminated from the Stanley Cup Playoffs.

 Scorer of game-winning goal in italics

Player stats 
Final Stats
Skaters

 †Denotes player spent time with another team before joining Bruins. Stats reflect time with the Bruins only.
 ‡Denotes player was traded mid-season. Stats reflect time with the Bruins only.
 (G)Denotes goaltender.

Goaltenders

Awards and records

Awards

Transactions 
The Bruins have been involved in the following transactions during the 2013–14 season:

Trades

Free agents acquired

Free agents lost

Claimed via waivers

Lost via waivers

Lost via retirement

Player signings

Draft picks

The Bruins drafted the following players at the 2013 NHL Entry Draft, in Newark, New Jersey, on June 30, 2013.

Draft notes
 Boston's first-round pick went to the Dallas Stars, as the result of a trade on April 2, 2013 that sent Jaromir Jagr to Boston, in exchange for Lane MacDermid, Cody Payne, and this pick.

References

Boston Bruins seasons
Boston Bruins
Presidents' Trophy seasons
Boston Bruins
Boston Bruins
Boston Bruins
Bruins
Bruins